The slender-billed xenops (Xenops tenuirostris) is a species of bird in the family Furnariidae. It is found in Bolivia, Brazil, Colombia, Ecuador, French Guiana, Guyana, Peru, Suriname, and Venezuela. Its natural habitats are subtropical or tropical moist lowland forest and subtropical or tropical swampland.

References

slender-billed xenops
Birds of the Amazon Basin
Birds of the Guianas
slender-billed xenops
Taxonomy articles created by Polbot